Hatun Hirka (Quechua hatun big, hirka mountain, "big mountain", also spelled Jatun Jirca) is a  mountain in the Andes of Peru. It is located in the Huánuco Region, Huánuco Province, on the border of the districts of Churubamba and Santa María del Valle.

References

Mountains of Peru
Mountains of Huánuco Region